Raymond Louie (born January 16, 1965) is a Canadian politician. He is a five-term Vancouver City Councillor.  Formerly a member of Coalition of Progressive Electors civic party, Louie broke away and was re-elected in 2005, and again in 2008, 2011, and 2014 as a member of Vision Vancouver.

Background
Louie was born and raised in East Vancouver, and has ancestry from Zhongshan, Guangdong, China. His family ran a local bakery.  He was the youngest of three siblings. He is distantly related to billionaire businessman Brandt Louie.  Louie attended Nootka Elementary School and Windermere Secondary School.  After graduating from high school he attended British Columbia Institute of Technology, yet never graduated.  Louie worked at Mail-O-Matic Services, a local mailing house, and as a mailer with Pacific Newspaper Group.  While working at Pacific Newspaper Group, Louie became a National Representative for the Communications, Energy and Paperworkers Union of Canada.

Vancouver City Council
Louie was first elected to Vancouver City Council in 2002, and was re-elected in 2005, 2008, 2011 and 2014.

As a City Councillor, Louie is on a number of local organizations, including, the Parent Advisory Committee for Maquinna Annex and Community Visions, a community liaison group in Hastings-Sunrise.

In Council, Louie has served in numerous city committees:

 Member, Standing Committee on Planning and Environment 
 Member, Standing Committee on Transportation and Traffic 
 Member, Standing Committee on City Services and Budgets 
 Director, Vancouver Parking Corporation 
 Director, Vancouver Civic Theatres Board 
 Co-Chair, Steering Committee for the redevelopment of Southeast False Creek 
 Vice-Chair, City Creative Task Force 
 Co-Chair, Mayor's Working Group on Immigration 
 Director, Greater Vancouver Regional District (GVRD) 
 Director, GVRD Labour Relations Bureau 
 Director, GVRD Finance Committee 
 Director, Greater Vancouver Transportation Authority (GVTA) 
 Director, GVTA Finance and Audit Committee 
 member of COPE

Homeless Emergency Action Team
Louie was one of three elected officials who served on Homeless Emergency Action Team, which conceived the controversial Homeless Emergency Action Team (HEAT) shelters.

Mayoral aspirations
In a 2007 interview, former Vancouver Mayor and current Senator, Larry Campbell, described Louie as a future mayor of Vancouver. Campbell added that he still holds that view, but wouldn't say if Louie should run for mayor in 2008. "That would be up to Raymond," Campbell said. "I just know that someday he'll be mayor. I don't know when that will be."  On March 12, 2008, Louie announced his intention to run for the Vision Vancouver mayoral nomination.  In an effort to secure the Vision Vancouver nomination, Louie outspent all mayoral hopefuls by spending a total of $243,621.  However, in June 2008 he was defeated in the Vision Vancouver nomination race by Gregor Robertson, who went on to win the subsequent general election.

Family life
Louie lives in East Vancouver with his wife and their three children.  He is an avid cyclist and has participated in the Gastown Grand Prix and Tour de White Rock.

References

External links
 

1965 births
Living people
Canadian politicians of Chinese descent
Coalition of Progressive Electors councillors
21st-century Canadian politicians
Vision Vancouver councillors